O'Driscoll (and its derivative Driscoll) is an Irish surname stemming from the Gaelic Ó hEidirsceoil clan. The O'Driscolls were rulers of the Dáirine sept of the Corcu Loígde until the early modern period. Their ancestors were Kings of Munster until the rise of the Eóganachta in the 7th century. At the start of the 13th century, three prominent branches of the family came into existence: O'Driscoll Mor, O'Driscoll Og, and O'Driscoll Beara. The Ó prefix was dropped by many in Ireland during the 17th and 18th centuries. The surname is now most prominent in the Irish counties of Cork and Kerry.

Naming conventions

Overview

The surname derives from the forename Eidirsceol, who was alive in the early-to-mid 10th century. The Irish word itself, eidirsceol, means "go-between" or "bearer of news".

The family are of Érainn, descent, specifically the Corcu Loígde population group. By the time the family began using the surname, the territory known as Corcu Loígde (roughly the same as the diocese of Ross) in south-west County Cork, was identified as their homeland, with the town of Baltimore been their seat. From the 12th century the Ó hEidirsceoil's were recorded as kings of Corcu Loígde.

Been driven so far south by the Gaelic Eóganachta and the Anglo-Normans, the family became expert sailors and fishermen. According to John Grenham:

From the thirteenth to the fifteenth centuries they struck an alliance with the Powers of County Waterford in their long feud with the burgesses and merchants of Waterford city, and many of their leaders were killed in battle on land and sea. The feud ended when one of the best known incidents occurred in 1413, when the Mayor of Waterford, Simon Wicken, arrived in Baltimore on Christmas Day and was invited to join in the Christmas festivities. From the fifteenth century on, the family struggled to retain lands and power taken by the English. By 1610, Baltimore had become an English port. In 1631 the town was sacked by Algerine pirates who according to the Irish poem, "Only Smiled; O'Driscolls Child", the pirates burned, raided and kidnapped their people. The poem describes a brave O'Driscoll girl who fought back against the pirates. The poem further describes that, "High on a gallows tree a yelling wretch is seen: Hackett of Dungarvan steered the Algerine". "Some mutter'd of MacMurchadh who brought the Norman O'er. Some curs'd him with Iscariot, that day in Baltimore!"

They are described by Donnchadh Ó Corráin as follows:

In general, the seafaring peoples of the south and west coast—Ua hEtersceóil, Ua Muirchertaig, Ua Conchobair Chiarraige, Ua Domnaill of Corcu Baiscind, Ua Flaithbeartaig, Ua Dubda, and others served as commanders of the king's fleets.

Though the landowners of the clan lost several castles during the 17th century war with Queen Elizabeth of England, most of those bearing the name in Ireland are still to be found living in the County Cork.

Forenames associated with the family included Finn and Con/Mac Con. From the late medieval era, they were anglicized as Florence and Cornelius.

Annalistic references
U=Annals of Ulster. AI=Annals of Inisfallen.

 U944:   Cairpre son of Mael Pátraic, king of Uí, Liatháin, and Finn son of Mután, king of Corcu Laígdi, were killed by the men of Mag Féine.
 AI1103: Conchobar Ua hEtersceóil, king of Corcu Laígde, died in Ros Ailithir.
 AI1103: The son of Ua hEtersceóil, king of Corcu Laígde, went to sea with a crew of twenty-five, {and unknown is their faring or their end thereafter}.
 AI1126: Ciarmac Ua hEtersceóil died.
 AI1178: Muirchertach, grandson of Domnall Ua Carthaig, was treacherously slain by Ua hEtersceóil {in Móin Cluana Cuarbáin and Hector(?)
 AI1179: The son of Finn Ua hEtersceóil was slain.
 AI1229: Donnchad Ó hEtersceóil, king of Corcu Laígde, died.

List of people
 Agnes Meyer Driscoll (1889–1971), American cryptanalyst
 Alfred E. Driscoll (1902–1975), American politician
 Barry Driscoll (1926–2006), British painter, wildlife artist and sculptor
 Bobby Driscoll (1937–1968), American Academy Award-winning actor
 Brian O'Driscoll (born 1979), Irish international rugby union player
 Bridget Driscoll (died 1896), early British automobile accident victim
 Bruce Driscoll (born 1983), Brazilian/American record producer, songwriter, guitarist, and vocalist
 Charles Benedict Driscoll (1885–1951), American journalist and editor
 Chris Driscoll (born 1971), Canadian lacrosse player
 Clara Driscoll (disambiguation), multiple people
 Dan O'Driscoll (born 1985), former drummer in The Divided, vocalist in British metal band Centuries
 Daniel A. Driscoll (1875–1955), Democratic politician from New York
 Daniel Patrick Driscoll (1862–1934), British army officer
 Danny Driscoll (1855–1888), American criminal and co-leader of the Whyos
 Denis J. Driscoll (1871–1958), Democratic politician from Pennsylvania
 Dennis O'Driscoll (1954–2012), Irish poet
 Denny Driscoll (1855–1886), American Major League Baseball player
 Emma O'Driscoll (born 1982), Irish television presenter
 Sir Fineen O'Driscoll (died 1629), Irish lord
 Gary Driscoll (1946–1987), American rock drummer
 Gay O'Driscoll, Dublin senior football player
 Ger O'Driscoll (disambiguation), multiple people
 Hockey Driscoll, rugby union and rugby league footballer who played in the 1890s and 1900s
 Gerry Driscol (1924–2011), American yacht racer and businessperson
 Jack Driscoll (American football) (born 1997), American football player
 Jackie O'Driscoll (1921–1988), Irish football winger
 James Driscoll (born 1977), American golfer
 Jean Driscoll (born 1966), American wheelchair racer
 Jim Driscoll (1880–1925), Welsh featherweight boxer
 Joe Driscoll (rapper) (born 1979), musician from New York
 John Driscoll (actor) (born 1981), American television and soap opera actor
 John L. Driscoll, American football coach and sports figure
 John R. Driscoll (1924–2014), American politician and businessman
 John O'Driscoll (rugby union) (born 1953), Irish international rugby union player
 John O'Driscoll (Gaelic footballer) (born 1967), Irish sportsperson
 Joseph Driscoll (Canadian politician) (1876–1942), Canadian politician and a municipal councillor in Edmonton, Alberta
 Joseph R. Driscoll, American politician, member of the Massachusetts House of Representatives
 Julie Driscoll (born 1947), English singer and actress
 Kat Driscoll (born 1986), British trampolinist
 Kermit Driscoll (born 1956), American jazz bassist
 Kieran O'Driscoll, Gaelic footballer
 Loren Driscoll (born 1928), American tenor
 Mark Driscoll (disambiguation), multiple people
 Mark Driscoll (screenwriter) (born 1959), American screenwriter
 Martha O'Driscoll (1922–1998), American film actress from 1937 until 1947
 Matthew Driscoll (born 1958), American politician
 Matthew Driscoll (basketball) (born 1964), American basketball coach
 Michael Driscoll (economist) (born 1950), British economist
 Michael E. Driscoll (1851–1929), American representative to New York
 Michael Patrick Driscoll (1939–2017), American Roman Catholic bishop
 Mick O'Driscoll (born 1978), Irish international rugby union player
 Paddy Driscoll (1895–1968), American professional football quarterback
 Pádraig O'Driscoll, Dublin senior hurler at Lucan Sarsfields
 Patricia Driscoll (1927–2020), Irish and British actress
 Patrick Driscoll (born 1987), Canadian musician
 Patrick O'Driscoll (1878–1949), Irish Clann na Talmhan politician
 Peter Driscoll (author) (1942–2005), British author
 Peter Driscoll (born 1954), Canadian ice hockey player
 Phil Driscoll (born 1947), American musician and minister
 Richard Driscoll,(born 1980) English comic
 Robin Driscoll, British actor and writer
 Robyn Driscoll (born 1962), Democratic politician from Montana
 Sean O'Driscoll (born 1957), English-born football manager and former player
 Shirley Driscoll (born 1935), English cricketer
 Terry Driscoll (born 1947), American basketball player
 William P. Driscoll (born 1947), American Navy flight officer

Fictional characters
 Becky Driscoll from the film Invasion of the Body Snatchers (1956)
 Elizabeth Driscoll from the film Invasion of the Body Snatchers (1978)
 Erin Driscoll from the television show 24
 Jack Driscoll from the King Kong franchise
 Peyton Driscoll from the television show CSI: NY
 Driscoll from the video game Front Mission
 Driscoll Berci from the manga series Bleach
 Colm O'Driscoll and his gang, the O'Driscolls, in the video game Red Dead Redemption 2 
 Driscoll Padgett from the novel Bleeding Edge
 Jesse Pinkman from the television series Breaking Bad, who adopts the surname Driscoll in the series epilogue film El Camino (2019)

References

 Family Names of Co. Cork, D. O'Murchadha, Glendale Press, Dublin, 1985.
 Driscolls and more Driscolls:from County Cork (Ireland) to Township York (Noble County, IN), Allen W. Driscoll, Wawaka, 1998.
 Byrne, Francis J., Irish Kings and High-Kings. Four Courts Press. 2nd edition, 2001.
 D'Alton, John, Illustrations, Historical and Genealogical, of King James's Irish Army List, 1689 2 vols. London: J.R. Smith. 2nd edition, 1861. (see under O'Donovan's Infantry)
 Lankford, E. 'O Driscolls Past and Present' Cape Clear Museum (2005) 
 Ó Corráin, Donnchadh, "Corcu Loígde: Land and Families", in Cork: History and Society. Interdisciplinary Essays on the History of an Irish County, edited by Patrick O'Flanagan and Cornelius G. Buttimer. Dublin: Geography Publications. 1993.
 O'Donovan, John (ed.), "The Genealogy of Corca Laidhe", in Miscellany of the Celtic Society. Dublin. 1849.
 O'Hart, John, Irish Pedigrees. Dublin. 5th edition, 1892.
 O'Rahilly, Thomas F., Early Irish History and Mythology. Dublin Institute for Advanced Studies. 1946.
 Old Irish-Gaelic Surnames: A Supplement to Ireland's History in Maps

External links
 Clan Driscoll of the Clans of Ireland
 O'Driscoll by Dave Driscoll
 O'Driscoll family pedigree at Library Ireland
 The O'Driscolls of West Cork
 Mumu
 Corca Laidhe ongoing Regional yDNA Study
 http://www.rootsweb.ancestry.com/~irlkik/ihm/ire1100.htm
 http://www.irishtimes.com/ancestor/surname/index.cfm?fuseaction=Go.&UserID= [1]
 http://www.libraryireland.com/articles/GarryowlCastleIDJ/index.php
 http://www.fluckers.com/family/driscoll/
 http://www.ucc.ie/celt/nation_kingship.html [2]

Irish families
Surnames of Irish origin
Anglicised Irish-language surnames
Families of Irish ancestry